Euskal Iraultzarako Alderdia (Party for the Basque Revolution) or EIA was a Basque Country/Spanish political party between 1977 and 1982.

History
The party was founded in April 1977 in Gallarta (Biscay) after the 7th general assembly of ETA, during the Spanish transition to democracy. Its ideology was based on a blend of "independentism" and socialism - originally, they tended to be rather Marxism-Leninism, but subsequently moved towards Eurocommunism.

EIA made a coalition with the Basque section of the Communist Movement of Spain (Movimiento Comunista de España), creating a coalition named Euskadiko Ezkerra. They won a seat in the Spanish Congress of Deputies, occupied by Francisco Letamendia (also known as "Ortzi") and another in the Senate, occupied by Juan María Bandrés. It campaigned for the "no" in the 1978 referendum to approve the Spanish constitution, but in favour of the Basque Statute of Autonomy in the referendum held in 1979. EIA disappeared in 1982, when Euskadiko Ezkerra became a political party.

References
 Gaizka Fernández Soldevilla, Agur a las armas. EIA, Euskadiko Ezkerra y la disolución de ETA político-militar (1976-1985), in Sancho el sabio. Revista de cultura e investigación vasca, ISSN 1131-5350, Nº 33, 2010, pp. 55–96  
 Javier Merino, El espejismo revolucionario: la izquierda radical ante ETA, in Cuadernos Bakeaz, nº 94, 2009 

Defunct communist parties in the Basque Country (autonomous community)
Defunct nationalist parties in Spain
Secessionist organizations in Europe
1977 establishments in Spain
Political parties established in 1977
1982 disestablishments in Spain
Political parties disestablished in 1982
Left-wing nationalist parties